Receptivity, or receptive agency, is a practical capacity and source of normativity, discussed and developed in various ways by writers such as Ralph Waldo Emerson, Stanley Cavell and Martin Heidegger, among others. According to the philosopher Nikolas Kompridis, who has argued for its importance to democratic politics, romanticism and critical theory, the term has both ontological and ethical dimensions, and refers to a mode of listening and "normative response" to demands arising outside the self, as well as "a way by which we might become more attuned to our pre-reflective understanding of the world, to our inherited ontologies," thereby generating non-instrumental possibilities for social change and self-transformation.

References

External links
 "A Politics of Receptivity". Special issue of Ethics and Global Politics, Vol 4, No 4 (2011), guest editor Nikolas Kompridis.

Critical theory
Concepts in ethics
Political theories